Lefevre Peninsula Primary School is a coeducational R-7 school (5-12 year olds) located in the Adelaide suburb of Birkenhead.

External links 
 Lefevre Peninsula Primary School Homepage

Primary schools in South Australia
Lefevre Peninsula